Amr Fahim (born October 4, 1976) is a retired Egyptian defender who played for the Egyptian Premier League side El-Entag El-Harby.

References

1976 births
Living people
Egyptian footballers
Association football defenders
Zamalek SC players
1998 African Cup of Nations players
2002 African Cup of Nations players
2004 African Cup of Nations players
ENPPI SC players
Egyptian Premier League players
Footballers from Cairo
Egypt international footballers